Matetsi is a village in Matabeleland North, Zimbabwe and is located about 55 km west of Hwange. The village started as a railway siding and took its name from the nearby Matetsi River. Most of the surrounding land is under forest and the Matetsi Safari Area. The nearest airports are Victoria Falls (Zimbabwe), Kasane (Botswana), and Livingstone (Zambia)

Matetsi Private Game Reserve: 55,000 hectare private wildlife concession, which forms a key part of the KAZA trans frontier. MPRG is the north-eastern section of the Matetsi Safari Area. MPGR is also bordered by the Zambezi River (North), Zambezi National Park (East) and Panda-Masuie Forest Reserve, home of the Zimbabwe Elephant Nursery (South). Within the reserve, close to the Sambesi river, there is a luxury accommodation, called Matetsi Victoria Falls.

Matetsi Safari Area: one of the largest hunting complexes in Zimbabwe, consisting of 7 separate concessions, covering  in total. The area reaches from the Zambezi River in the North to Hwange National Park in the South. It was named for the Matetsi River, which flows through the southern section of the Safari Area. The hunting area is famous for its large population of Sable antelopes. Generally the fauna resembles that of the neighbouring Hwange National Park.

Matetsi River: named for the blue-green algae, locally called “Matetsi”, found on the rocks of the river.

References

Populated places in Matabeleland North Province